Nawaf Khaled Al Khaldi (born 25 May 1981) is a retired Kuwaiti footballer who last played for Al-Qadsia.

Al Khaldi has made several appearances for the Kuwait national football team, including three qualifying matches for the 2010 FIFA World Cup.

See also
 List of men's footballers with 100 or more international caps

References

External links
 

1981 births
Living people
Kuwaiti footballers
Qadsia SC players
Kuwait international footballers
Olympic footballers of Kuwait
Footballers at the 2000 Summer Olympics
2004 AFC Asian Cup players
2011 AFC Asian Cup players
2015 AFC Asian Cup players
FIFA Century Club
Asian Games medalists in football
Footballers at the 1998 Asian Games
Footballers at the 2002 Asian Games
Asian Games silver medalists for Kuwait
Association football goalkeepers
Medalists at the 1998 Asian Games
AFC Cup winning players
Khaitan SC players
Kuwait Premier League players